Mário Manuel Cardoso de Araújo (born 24 January 1950 in Lisbon) is a Portuguese actor who specializes in films and telenovelas as well in Brazilian Portuguese-language dubbing.

Early in his career he also worked as a model. The first major television appearance as Robin Hood in O Trapalhão da Floresta (1974). He won international fame in the supporting role of Henrique Fontoura in the telenovela Escrava Isaura (1976). From the late 80s, he regularly took time out from television and worked in his original profession as a psychologist.

Selected filmography

References

External links
 
 Entry in Quem Dubla

1950 births
Living people
People from Lisbon
Portuguese male film actors
Portuguese male soap opera actors
Portuguese male voice actors
Portuguese voice directors
20th-century Portuguese male actors
21st-century Portuguese male actors